Natalya Burdyga (born 26 October 1983), later Natalya Otchenash, is a retired Russian (2001–2009) and Ukrainian (2010–2016) biathlete. In May 2015 she decided to retire, but in December 2015 she came back and performed at the Biathlon World Cup Stage #1 in Sweden. This was her last season - after it she announced about retirement due to family reasons.

Performances

(R) – representing Russia

World Cup

Podiums

Positions

(R) – representing Russia

References

External links
 Profile on biathlon.com.ua
 Profile in BiathlonRusBase
 

1983 births
Ukrainian female biathletes
Russian female biathletes
Living people
Olympic biathletes of Ukraine
Biathletes at the 2014 Winter Olympics
Universiade medalists in biathlon
Russian emigrants to Ukraine
Naturalized citizens of Ukraine
Universiade bronze medalists for Russia
Competitors at the 2003 Winter Universiade
Competitors at the 2005 Winter Universiade
People from Chaykovsky, Perm Krai
Sportspeople from Perm Krai